"The Night Begins to Shine" is a song by the fictional band B.E.R. popularized by the Teen Titans Go! TV series. The song was originally co-written and produced in 2005 as an "'80s-style song" for a music library. The song was first featured in the Teen Titans Go! episode "Slumber Party" as a throwaway joke. The song became popular with fans of the show. The song was subsequently featured in the episode "40%, 40%, 20%", and was prominently featured in two specials, the four-part 2017 special "The Day the Night Stopped Beginning to Shine and Became Dark Even Though It Was the Day" and a five-part sequel released in 2020, "The Night Begins to Shine 2".

The special also featured two other songs by B.E.R., "Forever Mine" and "Rise Up", as well as three covers of the song from Fall Out Boy, CeeLo Green, and Puffy AmiYumi. In 2021, Cartoon Network announced a spin-off series from Teen Titans Go! that will see the show's characters "journey back to the world of Night Begins to Shine ... to protect the only key to the world’s salvation, a magical mixtape".

Soundtrack 
The official soundtrack, Teen Titans Go! (Songs from The Night Begins to Shine Special), was released on July 28, 2017 through WaterTower Music and features music from the television special. All tracks are written by Carl Burnett, Frank Enea, and William J. Regan, except "Forever Mine", which was first written by Enea and rerecorded by B.E.R.

Commercial performance
Upon its official release, "The Night Begins to Shine" peaked at #23 on the Billboard Hot Rock Songs chart and #7 on the Billboard Rock Digital Songs chart. The song also peaked at #66 on the iTunes music charts and #1 on the iTunes rock music charts.
The song was covered by Fall Out Boy, CeeLo Green, and Puffy AmiYumi for a four-part Teen Titans Go! storyline. The soundtrack peaked at #8 on the Billboard Kid Albums chart and #17 on the Billboard Soundtracks chart.

Weekly charts

Single

Soundtrack

References

2015 debut singles
2015 songs
Songs from animated series
Synthwave songs
Teen Titans Go! (TV series)